Arkowyen or Arkovin or Arkevin or Arkavin may refer to:
 Arkowyen, Markazi
 Arkavin, West Azerbaijan
 Arkowyen, Zanjan